Blâmont is a commune in the Meurthe-et-Moselle department in northeastern France.

Population

Sights
The Château de Blâmont is the medieval castle below which the city grew.

See also
Communes of the Meurthe-et-Moselle department
Florent Schmitt (1870-1958), French composer born in Blâmont

References

Communes of Meurthe-et-Moselle
Duchy of Lorraine